Charles "Charlie" LaFayette Shepard was an award-winning, all-star and Grey Cup champion running back in the Canadian Football League with the Winnipeg Blue Bombers from 1957 to 1962.

A graduate of North Texas State University, Shepard played with the Pittsburgh Steelers in 1956, rushing for 91 yards in 12 games. He next joined the Blue Bombers in 1957 for an all-star 6-year stay. He would play in the Grey Cup championship game 5 of those years, winning 4 times. His best season was 1959, when he rushed for 1076 yards, was an all-star and was Grey Cup Most Valuable Player. He rushed for 3768 yards with the Bombers and was an excellent punter, never averaging less than 43.1 yards per punt in a season.

He has since been inducted into the Winnipeg Football Club Hall of Fame, in 1992, and the North Texas State University Athletic Hall of Fame in 2005. Charlie Shepard died July 23, 2009, age 76.

References

1933 births
2009 deaths
Players of American football from Dallas
Players of Canadian football from Dallas
American football running backs
North Texas Mean Green football players
Pittsburgh Steelers players
American players of Canadian football
Canadian football running backs
Winnipeg Blue Bombers players